Beese is a surname. Notable people with the surname include:
Amelie Beese (1886–1925), German aviator
Barbara Beese (born 1946), British activist
Baw Beese ( – ), Potawatomi Indian chief
Darcus Beese (born 1969), British music executive
Lorena S. Beese, American biochemist
Lotte Stam-Beese (1903–1988), German architect and urban planner